Anne C. Conway (born July 30, 1950) is an American lawyer and Senior United States district judge of the United States District Court for the Middle District of Florida. She is also serving as a Judge on the United States Foreign Intelligence Surveillance Court.

Education and career

Conway was born in Cleveland, Ohio. She received her Bachelor of Arts degree from John Carroll University in 1972 and her Juris Doctor from the University of Florida College of Law in 1975. At UF Law she was executive editor of Florida Law Review and interned with Legal Aid. After graduating law school, Conway was a law clerk to Judge John A. Reed Jr. of the United States District Court for the Middle District of Florida, serving from 1975 to 1977. She was in private practice in Orlando, Florida from 1978 to 1991. She joining the firm of Young, Turnbull & Linscott before moving to Wells, Gattis & Hallowes a year later. She was made a partner at Wells, Gattis & Hallowes in 1981. In 1982, Conway began practicing with Carlton, Fields, Ward, Emmanuel, Smith & Cutler.

Federal judicial service

President George H. W. Bush nominated Conway to the United States District Court for the Middle District of Florida on July 24, 1991, to the seat vacated by Judge George C. Carr. Confirmed by the Senate on November 21, 1991, she received commission on November 25, 1991. She served as Chief Judge from 2008 to 2015. She assumed senior status on August 1, 2015. She is stationed at the Orlando Division of the court.

In April 2016 Chief Justice John Roberts appointed Conway to the United States Foreign Intelligence Surveillance Court for a term starting May 19, 2016.

Judge Conway approved a 2017 FISA Court warrant for Carter Page, a former adviser to the 2016 Trump Campaign. The warrant application was released publicly in July 2018, marking the first time FISA warrant application materials were made public. The heavily-redacted, 412-page application cites many sources, including confidential informants. Among those many sources, the application cites the Steele dossier, leading former assistant U.S. attorney and legal commentator Andrew C. McCarthy to write, in reference to the fact that the renewal submission contained unverified allegations, an idea he had previously considered "crazy" ("It turns out, however, that the crazies were right and I was wrong,") that "the newly disclosed FISA applications are so shoddy that the judges who approved them ought to be asked some hard questions," and "what happened here flouts rudimentary investigative standards."

Other service

Conway serves on the board of advisers for the Center for Governmental Responsibility at the University of Florida.

References

External links
 

1950 births
20th-century American judges
John Carroll University alumni
Judges of the United States District Court for the Middle District of Florida
Living people
United States district court judges appointed by George H. W. Bush
Judges of the United States Foreign Intelligence Surveillance Court
Fredric G. Levin College of Law alumni
21st-century American judges
20th-century American women judges
21st-century American women judges